Worplesdon railway station is a railway station in the Woking district of Surrey, England.

The station opened in 1883, surrounded by open heath and farmland. Some nearby land has subsequently been developed and the station is currently situated in an area of affluent low-density housing.

Services 
At peak times the frequency is increased to half-hourly.

Sunday services began at this station at the start of 2020, with one train per hour on the Guildford - Waterloo (via Woking) suburban service calling here.

The ticket office and buffet are only open during the morning peak on weekdays; there is a self-service ticket machine for purchase of tickets at other times. The station has a car park and cycle rack.

External links 
 

Railway stations in Surrey
DfT Category E stations
Former London and South Western Railway stations
Railway stations in Great Britain opened in 1883
Railway stations served by South Western Railway